Amy Vincent (born 1959) is an American cinematographer who has been a member of the A.S.C. since 2002. She won the Excellence in Cinematography award at the 2005 Sundance Film Festival for her work on Hustle and Flow.

Life and career 
Amy Vincent was born in Boston, Massachusetts. She studied theater arts and film at the University of California, Santa Cruz from 1977 to 1983, and studied cinematography at the American Film Institute from 1990 to 1992. Her first job in the film industry was in the archive dept. of Warner Bros. Vincent was selected for an internship in the camera department of Warner Bros., and she later joined the International Cinematographer's Guild. She said in an interview with MovieMaker, “I came up in a very old school way - interning in the camera department, loading, assisting, and operating with people like John Lindley, Bob Richardson, Bill Pope. I didn’t even realize how much I learned from those guys until I finally got to shoot a film myself.”

Awards
2005 won the Vision Award at the Sundance Film Festival for Hustle & Flow
2001 won the Women in Film Kodak Vision Award for outstanding achievements in cinematography and for collaborating and assisting women in the entertainment industry.

Filmography

References

External links
 

1959 births
Living people
American cinematographers
American women cinematographers
Artists from Boston
Date of birth missing (living people)
21st-century American women